San Giuseppe dei Falegnami is a small Baroque-style, Roman Catholic church or oratory located at the corner of Via San Giuseppe and Via di Mezzo Muro in the center of Todi, province of Perugia, region of Umbria, Italy. The church was commissioned by the guild of carpenters and furniture-makers, who often took St Joseph as their patron. While the guild was present in Todi by 1282, the church was not erected until 1612. The main altar depicting the Holy Family with Joseph the carpenter (1623) was painted by Andrea Polinori.

References

Churches in Todi
Baroque architecture in Umbria
17th-century Roman Catholic church buildings in Italy